Guillermo John Roque Fernández de Soto Valderrama (born 27 September 1953) is a Colombian lawyer and diplomat, who has served as Secretary General of the Andean Community of Nations, Minister of Foreign Affairs of Colombia, Ambassador of Colombia to the Kingdom of the Netherlands, and designated-Ambassador Extraordinary and Plenipotenciary, Permanent Representative of Colombia to the United Nations in New York.

Biography 

Ambassador Fernandez de Soto holds a degree in law and economic sciences from Pontificia Universidad Javeriana and a Postgraduate degree in Socio-Economic Sciences from the same institution. He has had extensive experience in the field of international relations, Colombian diplomacy, academia, and in the professional practice in civil, commercial and international law.

Career

Early in his career, he worked as a Senior Specialist of the Organization of American States (OAS) Inter American Commission on Human Rights in Washington DC. He also served as Vice Minister of Foreign Affairs of Colombia (1985 – 1986) He worked in the Secretariat of the United Nations for the Commission of Truth in the peace process of El Salvador. Also, he worked for the United Nations Development Program (UNDP) for the preparation of the Special Economic Cooperation Plan for Central America.

In the commercial field, he was the President of the Chamber of Commerce of Bogotá (CCB) and held other positions such as President of the Ibero-American Association of Chambers of Commerce (AICO), General Director of the Inter-American Commercial Arbitration Commission, President of the Colombian Committee of the International Chamber of Commerce in Paris (ICC), President of the Colombian Committee of the Economic Council of the Pacific Basin (PBEC).

As well, he served as Member and Executive Secretary of the presidential Commission for the Colombo-Venezuelan border integration body 1988-1998.

He served as Minister of Foreign Affairs of Colombia from 1998 to 2002, a period during which he was also President of the Andean Council of Foreign Ministers and President of the United Nations Security Council (August, 2001). Later, he was Secretary General of the Andean Community until 2004.

He also served as Ambassador of Colombia to the Kingdom of the Netherlands (2004-2008), Permanent Representative of Colombia to the Organization for the Prohibition of Chemical Weapons (OPCW), Vice-President of the Tenth Conference of States Parties to the OPCW. In addition, he was the Representative of Colombia before the Administrative Council of the Permanent Court of Arbitration and Representative of Colombia before the Common Fund for Commodities.

Ambassador Fernández de Soto served as International Arbitrator in various disputes from Commercial and Administrative Law matters. He was also Co-agent before the International Court of Justice in the case of Aerial Spraying (Ecuador v. Colombia) and in the case of the Territorialand Maritime Dispute (Nicaragua v. Colombia). He was a member of the Inter-American Judicial Committee of the OAS and its president in 2011- 2012.

He was also President of the Colombian Council of International Relations (CORI). Most recently, he served as Corporate Director for Europe at CAF, the Development Bank of Latin America based in Madrid, Spain (2012-2018).

In the Academy, he served as the Dean of the Faculty of International Relations of the Universidad Jorge Tadeo Lozano in Bogotá, Executive Director of the International Studies Center “Interamerican Forum”. He has also participated in several academic publications as author and editor, and his articles have been published in several newspapers and magazines in Colombia.

Ambassador to the United Nations 

He was appointed in September 2018 by the President of the Republic of Colombia as Ambassador to the United Nations. In 2019 he assumed the Presidency of the United Nations Peacebuilding Commission. The Peacebuilding Support Office was established in 2005 as an advisory body to Member States and its role is to contribute to the maintenance of peace through international support for peacebuilding initiatives in different areas and regions of the world.

During his presidency, Fernandez de Soto visited Sierrea Leona, Loberia, Côte d'Ivoire and the African Union where he was able to witness the Commission's progress in peacebuilding. In January 2020 he handed over the presidency to the government of Canada while Colombia continues as vice president.

Decorations

 National Order of Merit (Grand Officer) - France
 Order of José Cecilio del Valle (Grand Cross) - Honduras
 Order of Francisco de Miranda (First Class) - Venezuela
 Order of the Liberator (Grand Cordon) - Venezuela
 Order of the Liberator General San Martin (Grand Cross) - Argentina
 Order of Bernardo O'Higgins (Grand Cross) - Chile
 Order of the Merit of Chile (Grand Cross) - Chile
 Order of the Sun (Grand Cross) - Peru
 Order of Isabella the Catholic (Grand Cross) - Spain
 Order of Simón Bolívar (Grand Cross) - Bolivia
 Order of Honorato Vásquez (Grand Cross) -Ecuador
 Order of the Aztec Eagle (Grand Band) - Mexico
 Order of Boyacá (Grand Cross) - Colombia
 Order of Vasco Núñez de Balboa (Grand Cross) -Panama
 Order of Orange-Nassau (Grand Cross) - Netherlands

External links
 Photo of Guillermo Fernández de Soto

References

People from Bogotá
Living people
Holguín family
Ambassadors of Colombia to the Netherlands
Foreign ministers of Colombia
Grand Officers of the Ordre national du Mérite
Knights Grand Cross of the Order of Orange-Nassau
Grand Crosses of the Order of the Sun of Peru
Knights Grand Cross of the Order of Isabella the Catholic
Colombian Conservative Party politicians
Permanent Representatives of Colombia to the Organisation for the Prohibition of Chemical Weapons
Andean Community people
1953 births
Permanent Representatives of Colombia to the United Nations